The Society for Sanity in Art was an American artist's society whose members strongly opposed all forms of modern art, including cubism, surrealism, and abstract expressionism.

History 
The society was founded in Chicago in 1936 by Josephine Hancock Logan, and eventually had branches is most US cities, with major branches in Boston and San Francisco. Ms. Logan also published a book entitled Sanity in Art in 1937.

Haig Patigian was the group's president in the 1940s. Margaret Fitzhugh Browne founded the Boston branch, and led it in protesting a 1940 exhibit of paintings by Picasso at the Museum of Fine Arts, Boston. A western branch of the Society changed its name to the Society of Western Artists in 1939; it is currently the largest society of representational artists in the western US. The society's San Francisco branch sponsored an annual art exhibit-for-sale by its members at the California Palace of the Legion of Honor at least as late as 1945.

Artists that supported the group's cause included William Winthrop Ward, Florence Louise Bryant, Percy Gray, Rudolph F. Ingerle, Frank Montague Moore, Thomas Hill, Frank Charles Peyraud, Theodore Wores and Chauncey Foster Ryder.

The Society gave awards to artists who met its standards of "sanity", included the Logan Medal of the Arts.

References

American artist groups and collectives
1936 establishments in Illinois
Conservative organizations in the United States
Arts organizations established in 1936